My First Romance is a 2003 Filipino romance film starring John Lloyd Cruz, Bea Alonzo, John Prats and Heart Evangelista released under Star Cinema. The movie did well in the box office with  gross revenue.

It has two stories, the first is called One Love starring John and Heart, the second is called Two hearts starring John Lloyd and Bea.

The tagline for the movie is: "Two love stories in one movie that will make you fall in-love like it's the first time!!!"

Plot

One Love
One Love is about two people who fall in love with each other even if they have two different worlds. Here, Jackie (Heart Evangelista) is the campus queen, rich, beautiful and is liked by everyone except Che (John Prats), who thinks that Jackie is just a shallow brat. After being forced to work together for school activities, Jackie made it a personal goal for Che to like her. Despite herself, she tries everything to please Che until she almost gives up hope. But with the presence of Jackie's Ate Glow, their personal belongings get mixed up. Because of this, both will discover the softer side of each other and their growing affections on the side, the two will eventually fall in love amidst the chaotic events that almost threatened their relationship.

 John Prats as Che Ricardo
 Heart Evangelista-Escudero as Jackie Ocampo 
 Cherie Gil as Jackie's Mom
 Bonggoy Manahan as Jackie's Dad
 Susan Africa as Che's Mom     
 Edwin Reyes as Che's Dad
 John Lapus as Tiger (a talking dog)
 Sarita Perez de Tagle as Celine
 Carla Humphries as Guia
 Maoui David as Ria
 Dianne Tejada - Pia
 Pauleen Luna as Sharri
 Drew Arellano as Ryan Gatmaitan
 Ate Glow as Yaya Glow
 Nicholas Garcia - Edgar
 Peter Serrano - Designer
 Jason Cuvinar - Bokoy
 Reyvaric Cuvinar Jr. - Bambam

Two Hearts
Two Hearts is the second episode in My First Romance starring John Lloyd and Bea. Enzo (John Lloyd Cruz) is star soccer player at school who loves the attention that he gets. However, he takes many things for granted but changes when he gets a heart problem and doctors say that only a heart transplant can save his life. Enzo gets a heart transplant after finding out that a guy who met an accident is a heart donor. This guy is the ex-boyfriend of Bianca (Bea Alonzo) who went to the States. Two years after the transplant, Enzo comes back to the Philippines and meets Bianca. She sees that Enzo and her ex-boyfriend are opposites but gives him a chance. After seeing the real Enzo, she appreciates him more and they slowly fall in love with each other but she still couldn't move on from her ex-boyfriend. Until a near death experience for Enzo changes her heart completely.

 John Lloyd Cruz as Enzo  
 Bea Alonzo as Bianca  
 Joel Torre as Dante
 Liza Lorena as Lourdes 
 Chat Silayan as Azon   
 Chanda Romero as Josie 
 Mico Palanca as Kiko 
 Anna Larrucea as Rhoda 
 Alyson Lualhati as Carla
 Dominic Ochoa as Jojo
 Vivian Foz as Nelly
 Kathleen Hermosa - Janice
 Mandy Ochoa - Edgar
 Joshua Dionisio as Xavier

Trivia
Prats and Evangelista were from Ang Tanging Ina (both film released in May and later became TV sitcom in August) while Cruz and Alonzo were from Kay Tagal Kang Hinintay (2 weeks before ended its 1-year run on November 13).

Theme song
The theme song, Please Be Careful With My Heart popularized by Hans and Heart Evangelista-Escudero and it was originally performed by Jose Mari Chan and Regine Velasquez-Alcasid. It was later used in Your Song'''s My Last Romance and in the 2012 morning drama series Be Careful With My Heart''.

External links
The Global Filipino Source
My First Romance
 

2003 films
2000s Tagalog-language films
2000s romance films
Star Cinema films
Philippine romance films
2000s English-language films
Films directed by Don Cuaresma